Josh Appelt is an American mixed martial artist currently competing in the Heavyweight division. A professional competitor since 2009, he has competed for Bellator and King of the Cage.

Background
Born and raised in California, Appelt wrestled in high school, competing in the state tournament twice during his junior and senior seasons. Appelt was originally introduced to mixed martial arts through fellow competitor Dave Huckaba, who Appelt helped with grappling during a training camp for a fight. A few months later, Appelt embarked upon his own career in MMA.

Mixed martial arts career

Early career: Gladiator Challenge
Appelt started his career in 2009. He fought mainly for California-based promotion Gladiator Challenge.

Appelt faced Angel DeAnda on July 17, 2010 for the Gladiator Challenge Heavyweight Championship. Appelt was defeated for the first time in his career via first-round TKO.

Appelt fought once again for the title on December 11, 2010 against Rob Jackson. Appelt won via TKO in the first round to become the new Gladiator Challenge Heavyweight Champion.

In 2012, with an overall record of 7-2, Appelt signed with Bellator.

Bellator
Appelt made his promotional debut against Ed Carpenter on November 2, 2012 at Bellator 79. He won via submission in the first round.

Appelt faced Josh Lanier on February 28, 2013 at Bellator 91. He won via TKO in the second round.

Just a week after his bout against Lanier, Appelt replaced Maurice Jackson against Manny Lara on March 7, 2013 at Bellator 92. He won via unanimous decision. Applet lost his last Bellator fight against Freddie Aquintania on April 4, 2014. Following the loss, Applet suffered two more defeats fighting in WFC.

On August 29, 2016, it was announced that Applet will face Bobby Lashley on October 21, 2016 at Bellator 162 after he picked up two consecutive wins fighting in WFC. Applet lost the fight via rear-naked choke submission in the second round.

Championships and accomplishments

Mixed martial arts
Gladiator Challenge
Gladiator Challenge Heavyweight Championship (Two times; current)
One Successful Title Defense
West Coast Fighting Championship
WFC Heavyweight Championship (One time, current)

Mixed martial arts record

|-
|Loss
|align=center|15–7
|Jeff Hughes
|TKO (punches)
|Dana White's Contender Series 14
|
|align=center|1
|align=center|4:26
|Las Vegas, Nevada, United States
|
|-
|Win
|align=center|15-6
|Anthony MacDonald
|TKO (punches)
|KOTC: Last Stand
|
|align=center|1
|align=center|0:48
|Oroville, California, United States
|
|-
|Win
|align=center|14-6
|Shannon Ritch
|TKO (punches)
|Gladiator Challenge: Contenders
|
|align=center|1
|align=center|1:08
|Lincoln, California, United States
|Defended Gladiator Challenge Heavyweight Championship.
|-
|Win
|align=center|13-6
|Ben Beebe
|TKO (punches)
|Gladiator Challenge: Mega Brawl
|
|align=center|1
|align=center|1:09
|Lincoln, California, United States
|Won the vacant Gladiator Challenge Heavyweight Championship.
|-
|Loss
|align=center|12–6
|Bobby Lashley
|Submission (rear-naked choke)
|Bellator 162
|
|align=center|2
|align=center|1:43
|Memphis, Tennessee, United States
|
|-
|Win
|align=center|12–5
|Roy Boughton
|TKO (punches)
|WFC 16: King of Sacramento
|
|align=center|2
|align=center|4:58
|Sacramento, California, United States
|Won the vacant WFC Heavyweight Championship.
|-
|Win
|align=center|11–5
|Joe Hernandez
|TKO (punches)
|WFC 15: Griffin vs. Wallace
|
|align=center|1
|align=center|1:58
|Sacramento, California, United States
|
|-
|Loss
|align=center|10–5
|Josue Lugo
|TKO (punches)
|WFC 13: Huckaba vs.Mitchell
|
|align=center|1
|align=center|0:14
|Sacramento, California, United States
|
|-
|Loss
|align=center|10–4
|Carl Seumanutafa
|Decision (unanimous)
|West Coast Fighting Championship 12
|
|align=center|3
|align=center|5:00
|Sacramento, California, United States
|
|-
|Loss
|align=center|10–3
|Freddie Aquitania
|Decision (unanimous)
|Bellator 115
|
|align=center|3
|align=center|5:00
|Reno, Nevada, United States
|
|-
|Win
|align=center|10–2
|Manny Lara
|Decision (unanimous)
|Bellator 92
|
|align=center|3
|align=center|5:00
|Temecula, California, United States
|
|-
|Win
|align=center|9–2
|Josh Lanier
|TKO (punches)
|Bellator 91
|
|align=center|2
|align=center|0:16
|Rio Rancho, New Mexico, United States
|
|-
|Win
|align=center|8–2
|Ed Carpenter
|Submission (rear-naked choke)
|Bellator 79
|
|align=center|1
|align=center|3:20
|Rama, Ontario, Canada
|
|-
|Win
|align=center|7–2
|C.J. Leveque
|TKO (punches)
|West Coast Fighting Championship: Showdown
|
|align=center|2
|align=center|2:43
|Yuba City, California, United States
|
|-
|Win
|align=center|6–2
|Rob Jackson
|TKO (punches)
|Gladiator Challenge: Mega Stars
|
|align=center|1
|align=center|N/A
|Lincoln, California, United States
|Won the Gladiator Challenge Heavyweight Championship.
|-
|Win
|align=center|5–2
|Robert Laroski
|KO (punch)
|Gladiator Challenge: Unleashed
|
|align=center|1
|align=center|N/A
|Lincoln, California, United States
|
|-
|Loss
|align=center|4–2
|C.J. Leveque
|Decision (unanimous)
|Rebel Fights
|
|align=center|3
|align=center|3:00
|Plymouth, California, United States
|
|-
|Loss
|align=center|4–1
|Angel DeAnda
|TKO (punches)
|Gladiator Challenge: Patriots
|
|align=center|1
|align=center|2:56
|Placerville, California, United States
|For the Gladiator Challenge Heavyweight Championship.
|-
|Win
|align=center|4–0
|Marcus Osbourn
|Submission (rear-naked choke)
|Gladiator Challenge: Champions
|
|align=center|1
|align=center|1:39
|Placerville, California, United States
|
|-
|Win
|align=center|3–0
|Keith Corum
|TKO (punches)
|Battle of the Valley 2
|
|align=center|3
|align=center|2:36
|Stockton, California, United States
|
|-
|Win
|align=center|2–0
|Michael Woodworth
|Decision (unanimous)
|Gladiator Challenge: Validation
|
|align=center|3
|align=center|5:00
|Roseville, California, United States
|
|-
|Win
|align=center|1–0
|Mike Martin
|TKO (punches)
|Gladiator Challenge: Put Up or Shut Up
|
|align=center|1
|align=center|0:48
|Lakeport, California, United States
|

References

Living people
People from Yuba City, California
American male mixed martial artists
Mixed martial artists from California
Heavyweight mixed martial artists
Mixed martial artists utilizing wrestling
1983 births